Gladstone is an unincorporated community in Greene County, in the U.S. state of Ohio.

History
Gladstone was not officially platted. A post office called Gladstone was established in 1886, and remained in operation until 1904.

References

Unincorporated communities in Greene County, Ohio
1886 establishments in Ohio
Populated places established in 1886
Unincorporated communities in Ohio